The Academy Award for Best Cinematography is an Academy Award awarded each year to a cinematographer for work on one particular motion picture.

History

In its first film season, 1927–28, this award (like others such as the acting awards) was not tied to a specific film; all of the work by the nominated cinematographers during the qualifying period was listed after their names. The problem with this system became obvious the first year, since Karl Struss and Charles Rosher were nominated for their work together on Sunrise but three other films shot individually by either Rosher or Struss were also listed as part of the nomination. In the second year, 1929, there were no nominations at all, although the Academy has a list of unofficial titles that were under consideration by the Board of Judges. In the third year, 1930, films, not cinematographers, were nominated, and the final award did not show the cinematographer's name.

Finally, for the 1931 awards, the modern system in which individuals are nominated for a single film each was adopted in all profession-related categories. From 1939 to 1967 with the exception of 1957, there were also separate awards for color and for black-and-white cinematography. After Who's Afraid of Virginia Woolf? (1966), the most recent black-and-white films to win since then are Schindler's List (1993), Roma (2018) and Mank (2020).

Floyd Crosby won the award for Tabu in 1931, which was the last silent film to win in this category. Hal Mohr won the only write-in Academy Award ever, in 1935 for A Midsummer Night's Dream. Mohr was also the first person to win for both black-and-white and color cinematography.

No winners are lost, although some of the earliest nominees (and of the unofficial nominees of 1928–29) are lost, including The Devil Dancer (1927), The Magic Flame (1927), and 4 Devils (1928). The Right to Love (1930) is incomplete, and Sadie Thompson (1927) is incomplete and partially reconstructed with stills.

David Lean holds the record for the director with the most films that won the Academy Award for Best Cinematography at the Oscars with five wins out of six nominations for Great Expectations, The Bridge on the River Kwai, Lawrence of Arabia, Doctor Zhivago, and Ryan's Daughter.

The first nominees shot primarily on digital video were The Curious Case of Benjamin Button and Slumdog Millionaire in 2009, with Slumdog Millionaire the first winner. The following year, Avatar was the first nominee and winner to be shot entirely on digital video.

In 2018, Rachel Morrison became the first woman to receive a nomination. Prior to that, it had been the last non-acting Academy Award category to never nominate a woman.

In 2019, Alfonso Cuarón became the first winner of this category to have also served as director on the film, for Roma. This followed a public dispute between Cuarón and the Academy over the Academy's plan to shorten the Oscars broadcast by relegating four awards, including cinematography, to the commercial breaks in the show. Cuarón objected by saying, "In the history of cinema, masterpieces have existed without sound, without color, without a story, without actors and without music. No one single film has ever existed without cinematography ..."

Superlatives

Winners and nominees
Winners are listed first in colored row, followed by the other nominees.

1920s

1930s

1940s

1950s

1960s

1970s

1980s

1990s

2000s

2010s

2020s

Multiple awards and nominations

See also
 BAFTA Award for Best Cinematography
 Independent Spirit Award for Best Cinematography
 Critics' Choice Movie Award for Best Cinematography
 American Society of Cinematographers Award for Outstanding Achievement in Cinematography in Theatrical Releases
 Satellite Award for Best Cinematography

Notes

References

External links
 Academy of Motion Picture Arts and Sciences official site
 The Official Academy Awards Database, listing all past nominees and winners

Cinematography
Awards for best cinematography